Andrzej Jastrzębiec (died 1398), also known as Andrzej Wasilko or Andrzej Polak, was a Polish Catholic priest and diplomat, a first bishop of Seret and of Vilnius. Little is known of his youth and he might have been born to a peasant family. He joined the Franciscans and quickly rose through the ranks of the order.

The first verified mention of Andrzej Jastrzębiec dates back to 1354, when he was listed among the parochs in Mazovia. After a brief time spent as a missionary in the pagan Grand Duchy of Lithuania, he moved to the royal court of Hungary, where he became the confessor to Elizabeth of Poland, Queen of Hungary. From there he set off to Moldavia, where he spent several years as a missionary. As an effect of his mission, on July 31, 1370, a new bishopric of Seret was created and the following year Andrzej became its first bishop.

Already in 1372 he moved back to Poland, where he took over the diocese of Halych. Between 1376 and 1386 he served as an auxiliary bishop in the diocese of Gniezno. In 1388, king Władysław II of Poland sent Andrzej with a mission to baptise Lithuania. Following the creation of a diocese of Vilnius, Andrzej became its first bishop. He died November 14, 1398 and was succeeded by his deputy, Jakub Plichta.

See also 
 Wojciech Jastrzębiec

References 
 
 

1398 deaths
Bishops of Vilnius
Diplomats of the Polish–Lithuanian Commonwealth
14th-century Roman Catholic bishops in Moldavia
Year of birth unknown
Clan of Jastrzębiec
Polish nobility
14th-century Roman Catholic bishops in Lithuania